Downtown Rowlett station is a light rail and bus station operated by Dallas Area Rapid Transit in Rowlett, Texas (USA). It is the northern terminus of the DART Blue Line. Before rail service began in December 2012, the station was known as Rowlett Park & Ride.

References 

Dallas Area Rapid Transit light rail stations
Railway stations in the United States opened in 2012
2012 establishments in Texas
Railway stations in Dallas County, Texas